General Lutz may refer to:

Catherine S. Lutz (1955–2014), Mississippi National Guard major general
Joseph Lutz (general) (1933–1999), U.S. Army major general
Oswald Lutz (1876–1944), German Wehrmacht general

See also
Eduard von Lutz (1810–1893), Bavarian major general